Ludovicus or Ludowicus is a Latinized form of the Germanic masculine given name Hludwig ("Louis"). It has been used as a baptismal name in the Low Countries, especially in Belgium; bearers often use(d) Lodewijk or short forms like Lode, Lou, Louis, or Ludo in daily life. People with the name include:

Latinized name
Ludovicus Blosius (Louis de Blois; 1506–1566), Belgian monk and mystical writer
Ludovicus Cappellus (Louis Cappel; 1585–1658), French Protestant churchman and scholar
Ludovicus Carrio Brugensis (Louis Carrion; 1547–1595), Flemish humanist and classical scholar
Ludovicus Episcopius (Ludovicus de Bisschop; c.1520–1595), Flemish composer 
Ludovicus Finsonius (Louis Finson; c.1575–1617), Flemish Baroque painter
Ludovicus Mamburgus (Louis Maimbourg; 1610–1686), French Jesuit and historian
Ludovicus Molinaeus (Lewis Du Moulin; 1606–1680), French Huguenot physician and controversialist in England
 (Luis Nuñez; 1553–1645), Flemish physician and humanist
Ludovicus Rabus (Ludwig Rab; 1523–1592), German Lutheran theologian
Ludovicus a S. Carolo (Louis Jacob; 1608–1670), French Carmelite scholar, writer and bibliographer
Ludovicus Sanctus (Lodewijk Heiligen; 1304–1361), Flemish Benedictine monk and music theorist 
Ludovicus Thomassinus (Louis Thomassin; 1619–1695), French theologian and Oratorian
Ludovicus Tubero (1459–1527), Ragusan historian
Ludovicus Casparus Valckenarius (Lodewijk Caspar Valckenaer; 1715–1785), Dutch classical scholar
Ludovicus Vives (Luis Vives; 1493–1540), Valencian scholar and humanist in the Southern Netherlands
Adopted/monastic name
Ludovicus Baba (ルイス馬場, died 1624), Japanese Franciscan missionary and saint
Ludovicus de Beaumanoir, pseudonym of Louis Richeome (1544–1625), French Jesuit theologian and controversialist.
Ludovicus Sasada (ルイス笹田, 1598–1624), Japanese Franciscan missionary and saint
Birth name
 (1803–1836), Flemish pianist
 (1879–1965), Belgian naturalist writer
Ludovicus de Bisschop (c.1520–1595), Flemish composer 
P. Ludovicus "Louis" Brion (1782–1821), Belgian-Curaçaon officer, admiral for Venezuela and Colombia
Ludovicus "Louis" de Dieu (1590–1642), Dutch Protestant minister and orientalist
Ludovicus Makeblijde (1565–1630), Flemish Jesuit, poet and hymn writer
Ludovicus Neefs (1617–c.1649), Flemish Baroque painter 
 (1894–1974), Dutch teacher and historian
Ludovicus Schoenmaekers (born 1931), Belgian swimmer
Ludovicus Stornebrink (1847–1941), Dutch-born Japanese businessman
Ludovicus M. M. Van Iersel (1893–1987), Dutch-born Sergeant in the United States Army
Ludovicus Carolus "Lode" Zielens (1901–1944), Belgian novelist and journalist

Latin masculine given names
Dutch masculine given names